The Harry Reid Airport Connector (RAC) is a limited-access roadway system located in Paradise, an unincorporated town in the Las Vegas Valley, Clark County, Nevada, United States. Composed of State Route 171 (SR 171), the Airport Tunnel and arterial streets, the airport connector provides vehicular access to the passenger terminals at Harry Reid International Airport. Despite being completely owned by Clark County, the first  of the Harry Reid Airport Connector is maintained by NDOT as unsigned SR 171, while the remaining section is maintained by Clark County.

The Harry Reid Airport Connector was constructed and opened to traffic in 1994, in conjunction with the completion of I-215 between Interstate 15 and Warm Springs Road.

Route description

The Harry Reid Airport Connector begins at an interchange with Interstate 215 (exit 10) in Paradise. From there, the route follows unsigned State Route 171 as it transitions to a below-ground freeway alignment. The connector crosses underneath several local streets and a branch line of the Union Pacific Railroad as it heads northward towards the airport. SR 171 encounters a half-diamond interchange with Sunset Road (SR 562), where the state highway designation ends  at the south portal of the airport tunnel.

The Airport Tunnel is a grouping of three separate tunnels. One tunnel is provided for northbound traffic with another for southbound traffic, and third tunnel between them is reserved for future transit use. The tunnels continue northward, crossing under the east–west runways and taxiways of the airport and emerging on the opposite side.

Curving westward after exiting the north portal, the RAC meets the main terminal grounds with ramps providing terminal access to and from the south. The freeway grade road ends with a traffic signal at Russell Road. North of the signal, the connector transitions to a one-way couplet network, with northbound traffic following University Center Drive (formerly Swenson Street) and southbound traffic using Paradise Road. Another set of ramps provides airport terminal access to and from the north. Finally, the Harry Reid Airport Connector ends at Tropicana Avenue (SR 593), although the one-way roads continue north for about a mile to Harmon Avenue.

In addition to providing access to the airport, the connector also serves as a shortcut between I-215 and Tropicana Avenue (SR 593) near the Thomas & Mack Center on the University of Nevada, Las Vegas (UNLV) campus. Also, following the relocation of McCarran Airport's car rental facilities to a new, centralized complex at 7135 Gilespie Street, SR 171 and the tunnel are now used by all shuttle buses carrying customers between the main passenger terminals and the rental car facility.

History
SR 171 and the Airport Tunnel opened to traffic in 1994, in conjunction with the completion of I-215 between Interstate 15 and Warm Springs Road.

Major intersections

See also

References

Buildings and structures in Paradise, Nevada
Connector
Road tunnels in the United States
Transportation in the Las Vegas Valley
Tunnels completed in 1994
Tunnels in Nevada